"Cigno nero" is a song performed by Italian rapper and singer Fedez featuring vocals from Francesca Michielin. The song was released as a digital download on 1 March 2013 by Sony Music and included in Fedez's third studio album Sig. Brainwash - L'arte di accontentare.

Music video
The music video for "Cigno nero", directed by Fabio Berton and Andrea Rebuscini, was released on 4 March 2013 via Fedez's YouTube channel.

Track listing

Chart performance

Weekly charts

Certifications

References

2013 songs
2013 singles
Fedez songs
Francesca Michielin songs